The 2017–18 Georgetown Hoyas women's basketball team represents Georgetown University in the 2017–18 college basketball season. The Hoyas, led by first year head coach James Howard and are members of the Big East Conference. The Hoyas play their home games at the McDonough Gymnasium. They finished the season 16–16, 9–9 in Big East play to finish in a tie for fifth place. They advanced to the semifinals of the Big East women's tournament where they lost to DePaul. They received an at-large to the WNIT where they defeated Delaware in the first round before losing to Duquesne in the second round.

Previous season
They finished the season 17–13, 9–9 in Big East play to finish in sixth place. They lost in quarterfinals of the Big East women's tournament to Marquette. They were invited to the WNIT where they lost to Fordham in the first round.

Roster

Schedule

|-
!colspan=9 style=| Non-conference regular season

|-
!colspan=9 style=| Conference regular season

|-
!colspan=9 style=| Big East Women's Tournament

|-
!colspan=9 style=| NCAA Women's Tournament

Rankings
2017–18 NCAA Division I women's basketball rankings

See also
2017–18 Georgetown Hoyas men's basketball team

References

Georgetown
Georgetown Hoyas women's basketball seasons
Georgetown